Veronica Waceke is a Kenyan actress.  She first appeared in the 2015 film Fundi-Mentals.  For her performance in the film My Faith, Waceke won the Best East African Female Actress award at the Mashariki Film Festival.  She portrayed Lesedi in the Kenya National Theatre's production of Walter Sitati's play; Necessary Madness 2 and Deliberate Contempt in 2019.  Waceke was nominated for the 2014 Africa Magic Viewers' Choice Award for the  Best Actress in a television drama series 'Higher Learning'.

Awards 
Best Supporting Actress - Riverwood Awards

Best Actress - Mashariki Film Festival Awards 2015

Select filmography
The Captain of Nakara (2012)
Fundi-Mentals (2015)

References

External links
 

Living people
Kenyan film actresses
Kenyan television actresses
Kenyan stage actresses
21st-century Kenyan actresses
Year of birth missing (living people)